Joaquim Costa (23 January 193615 February 2008) was a Portuguese rock and roll performer. He was a pioneer in bringing rock and roll to Portugal.

References

1936 births
2008 deaths
Portuguese pop musicians
20th-century Portuguese male singers